Dilip Ghosh is an American economist, being Distinguished Professor at Bang School of Business, KIMEP University in 2014 and formerly the Hellenic Bank Association Associate Chair at Sofia University in 2009.

Education
Ghosh received an Masters of Business Administration from University of Rochester and a Ph.D. from State University of New York at Buffalo.

References

Year of birth missing (living people)
Living people
American economists
Academic staff of Sofia University
University at Buffalo alumni
University of Rochester alumni